Michael J. Lewis is an American art historian and architectural critic. He is the Faison-Pierson-Stoddard Professor of Art History at Williams College and the architectural critic for The Wall Street Journal.

Works 

 City of Refuge. Separatists and Utopian Town Planning . Princeton University Press, Princeton 2016, .
 American Art and Architecture. Thames & Hudson, London 2006.
 Gothic revival. Thames and Hudson, London 2002, .
 Frank Furness. Architecture and the Violent Mind. WW Norton, New York 2001, .
 Monument to Philanthropy: The Design and Building of Girard College, 1832-1848 (with Bruce Laverty and Michelle Taillon Taylor). Girard College, Philadelphia 1998.
 Drawn from the Source: The Travel Drawings of Louis I. Kahn, catalog of an exhibition at the Williams College Museum of Art (with Eugene J. Johnson). MIT Press, Cambridge, Mass. 1996.
 La Geometry de la Fortification: Traites et Manuels, 1500-1800 / The Geometry of Defense, Catalog of an exhibition at the Canadian Center for Architecture. Canadian Center for Architecture, Montreal 1992.
 Frank Furness, The Complete Works. (together with George E. Thomas and Jeffrey A. Cohen). Princeton Architectural Press, New York 1991/1996.
 The Politics of the German Gothic Revival. Architectural History Foundation and MIT Press, New York 1993, .

References 

Williams College faculty
Living people
The Wall Street Journal people
Year of birth missing (living people)